Astronomy Club: The Sketch Show is an American sketch comedy streaming television series created by the comedy troupe Astronomy Club, the Upright Citizens Brigade's first all black team. The show stars the team's eight members: Shawtane Bowen, Jonathan Braylock, Ray Cordova, James III, Caroline Martin, Jerah Milligan, Monique Moses and Keisha Zollar. The show features comedy sketches, intermixed with clips from a reality television show where the members live together in a house. The series premiered on December 6, 2019 on Netflix. In June 2020, the series was canceled after one season.

Synopsis 
Sketches in the show deal with a range of issues, with a focus on the black experience, race relations, and attitudes towards African-Americans in the media, and cinema in particular.

Structure
Each episode starts with a cold-open, a sketch before the opening credits. Segments between the sketches depict a fake reality show wherein the Astronomy Club members live together in the Astronomy Clubhouse, playing heightened versions of themselves. The show includes Big Brother-style confessionals, where cast members talk to the camera.

Cast 

 Shawtane Bowen
 Jonathan Braylock
 Ray Cordova
 James III
 Caroline Martin
 Jerah Milligan
 Monique Moses
Keisha Zollar

Guest stars

Episodes

Production
The show is produced under the banner of Khalabo Ink Society by producer Kenya Barris, creator of Black-ish. Barris developed Astronomy Club as a part of a $100 million development deal with Netflix.

According to an interview, the comedy troupe wanted the sketches to have a message, and "anytime one of [their] sketches tackles race, [they] have to make sure it says something."

Cancellation
On June 3, 2020, Netflix canceled the series after one season.

Critical reception 
The show received positive critical reception and is rated 100% on Rotten Tomatoes. Caroline Framke writing for Variety stated "This first episode sets the standard for “Astronomy Club” as clever, ambitious, and perhaps most importantly for a sketch show, both self-aware and completely ridiculous."

References

External links

2019 American television series debuts
2019 American television series endings
2010s American black television series
2010s American sketch comedy television series
English-language Netflix original programming